KKEI-CD (channel 38) is a low-powered, Class A television station in Portland, Oregon, United States, that currently carries no programming. Owned by Watch TV, Inc, it carried programming from Telemundo in the past.

See also
KORK-CD
KORS-CD
KOXI-CD
KOXO-CD

References

External links
WatchTV, Inc.

Hispanic and Latino American culture in Portland, Oregon
KEI-CD
Television channels and stations established in 1989
1989 establishments in Oregon
Spanish-language television stations in Oregon
Low-power television stations in the United States